Neohelluo angulicollis is a species of beetle in the family Carabidae, the only species in the genus Neohelluo.

References

Anthiinae (beetle)